Elvis Gordon (23 June 1958 – 11 May 2011) was a Jamaican-born English heavyweight judoka who won numerous medals representing Great Britain. He competed for Great Britain at the 1984, 1988 and 1992 Olympic games. Gordon won silver in the 1987 World Judo Championships, was European champion in 1988, and Commonwealth champion in 1986 and 1990. He retired from competitive judo in 1993, and subsequently competed at the 1994 Sumo World Championships as a wrestler in the heavyweight category. In 2009, he made a brief return to judo, winning silver at the 2009 British Masters Championship in the men's 50–54 years over-100 kg category.

Early life
Gordon was born on 23 June 1958 in Hanover, Jamaica. He emigrated to Britain with his family in 1967, settling in Wolverhampton, West Midlands. Gordon began studying judo in 1972 at Northicote School, Wolverhampton, and joined the Wolverhampton Judo Club, coached by Malcolm "Mac" Abbotts. Abbotts said of him: "I couldn't believe the strength in him, even at that age." As a teenager, Gordon drifted from judo into powerlifting, and came 2nd in the under-19 national powerlifting championships at age 15.

Major achievements
 3 x times Olympian (1984, 1988, 1992)
 World Championship silver medal (1987)
 3 x times Commonwealth gold medallist (1986 x2, 1990)
 European Championship gold (1988) and 2 bronze 1985 & 1992)
 8 x times champion of Great Britain at the British Judo Championships 1981, 1983, 1984, 1985 (+open), 1987, 1989, 1991.
 In 1986, he won the bronze medal in the 95kg weight category at the judo demonstration sport event as part of the 1986 Commonwealth Games.

Later life
After retiring from competitive sport, Gordon was employed as the caretaker at Moseley Park School in Bilston, West Midlands, where he also provided judo coaching. In 2010, he was diagnosed with pancreatic cancer, and died in May 2011. Following Gordon's death, students at his place of work chose to name the school's new gymnasium after him. Nick Elwiss, the head teacher, said: "He was held in extremely high regard by staff and pupils and is fondly remembered by us all."

See also
 Judo in the United Kingdom

References

External links
 

1958 births
2011 deaths
Black British sportspeople
English male judoka
Commonwealth Games gold medallists for England
Commonwealth Games medallists in judo
English sumo wrestlers
Olympic judoka of Great Britain
People from Hanover Parish
Sportspeople from Wolverhampton
Judoka at the 1984 Summer Olympics
Judoka at the 1988 Summer Olympics
Judoka at the 1992 Summer Olympics
Jamaican emigrants to the United Kingdom
English people of Jamaican descent
Judoka at the 1990 Commonwealth Games
Medallists at the 1990 Commonwealth Games